Twice a Fortnight is a 1967 British sketch comedy television series with Terry Jones, Michael Palin, Graeme Garden, Bill Oddie, Jonathan Lynn and Tony Buffery.

Graeme Garden suggested to the director, Tony Palmer, that Michael Palin and Terry Jones be included in the cast and writers of the show.

Influences of the series

As in the case of the radio comedy programme I'm Sorry, I'll Read That Again, and the television comedy programmes At Last the 1948 Show, Do Not Adjust Your Set and Broaden Your Mind, Twice a Fortnight was an excellent training ground, in both writing and acting, for the future stars of both Monty Python and The Goodies, as well as for the future co-writer of Yes Minister and Yes, Prime Minister.

References

External links
 Comedy Guide
 

1967 British television series debuts
1967 British television series endings
1960s British television sketch shows
BBC television sketch shows
English-language television shows